The Ark is a rock summit, in the central part of the Read Mountains, in the Shackleton Range in Antarctica. First mapped in 1957 by the CTAE. The name, given by the United Kingdom Antarctic Place-Names Committee (UK-APC), is descriptive of its shape when viewed from the west.

References

Mountains of Coats Land